Essi Maria Viding FBA FMedSci is Professor of Developmental Psychopathology at University College London in the Faculty of Brain Sciences, where she co-directs the Developmental Risk and Resilience Unit, and an associate of King's College London's Institute of Psychiatry, Psychology and Neuroscience. Viding's research focuses on development of disruptive behaviour disorders, as well as children and young people's mental health problems more broadly. She uses cognitive experimental measures, brain imaging and genetically informative study designs in her work.

Education
Viding was educated at King's College London where she was awarded a PhD in 2004 for research supervised by Francesca Happé. She did her postdoctoral research under the supervision of Robert Plomin.

Awards and honours
Viding was the 2011 winner of the British Psychological Society's Spearman Medal, and received the 2017 Rosalind Franklin Award.
She was elected Fellow of the British Academy in 2020 and Fellow of the Academy of Medical Sciences in 2021.

Publications
 Psychopathy: A Very Short Introduction, 2019

References

Spearman medal winners
Academics of University College London
21st-century British psychologists
21st-century Finnish scientists
21st-century British women scientists
Finnish women scientists
British psychologists
British women psychologists
Living people
Year of birth missing (living people)